Ignacio Ayala Rojas (born 29 November 1997) is a Chilean footballer who plays for Deportes Recoleta.

References

1997 births
Living people
Chilean footballers
Chilean Primera División players
Club Deportivo Palestino footballers
Association football defenders
People from Santiago Province, Chile